Colonel Richard Kirby Ridgeway  (18 August 1848 – 11 October 1924) was an Irish recipient of the Victoria Cross, the highest and most prestigious award for gallantry in the face of the enemy that can be awarded to British and Commonwealth forces.

Biography
Ridgeway was born on 18 August 1848 in Oldcastle, County Meath, Ireland.

On 22 November 1879, he was 31 years old, and a captain in the Bengal Staff Corps, 44th Gurkha Rifles (later 1/8th Gurkha Rifles), British Indian Army, during the Naga Hills Expedition. On that date, during the final assault on Konoma, Eastern Frontier of India, under heavy fire from the enemy, Captain Ridgeway rushed up to a barricade and attempted to tear down the planking surrounding it to enable him to effect an entrance. While doing this he was wounded severely in the right shoulder.

He later achieved the rank of colonel.

He died at the age of 76 in Harrogate, Yorkshire on 11 October 1924.

See also
List of Brigade of Gurkhas recipients of the Victoria Cross

Notes and references

Listed in order of publication year 
The Register of the Victoria Cross (1981, 1988 and 1997)

Ireland's VCs  (Dept of Economic Development, 1995)
Monuments to Courage (David Harvey, 1999)
Irish Winners of the Victoria Cross (Richard Doherty & David Truesdale, 2000)

External links
Location of grave and VC medal (West Yorkshire)

Irish recipients of the Victoria Cross
19th-century Irish people
Irish soldiers in the British Indian Army
Bengal Staff Corps officers
Companions of the Order of the Bath
British military personnel of the Tirah campaign
People from County Meath
Burials in Yorkshire
1848 births
1924 deaths
British Indian Army officers